Gyzylbaýyr (formerly called Şarlawuk) is a village in far south-western Turkmenistan, in Etrek District, Balkan Province. It lies on the Atrek River not far from the border with Iran and is bisected by the P-15 highway between Serdar and Etrek.

References

Populated places in Balkan Region